Chamical is a small city in, and the seat of government of, Chamical Department in the south of La Rioja Province, Argentina. It is home to the CELPA aerospace test center, founded in 1961 and operated by the Argentine Air Force. The town, which is crossed by the Tirante wadi, lies on the Ruta 38 (Spanish Wikipedia), around 140 km from La Rioja (2 hours by bus), and some 300 km from Córdoba (4 hours by bus).

This young urban habitation has been an important site in several stages of Argentine history during the past fifty years.

Chamical is regarded as the tango hub in La Rioja Province.

Name origin
Chamical got its name from the many specimens of the medicinal herb known as chamico (Spanish, "jimsonweed") found growing wild in the area.

Geography and climate
Chamical is located in the droughty Llanos Riojanos (Spanish for "Riojan Plains") and has four marked seasons, giving it a BSh hot semi-arid climate under the Köppen climate classification. There has hardly ever been any snow or frost, but there has often been hail.

Total yearly precipitation averages a scanty  with plentiful sunny days, and the rainfall centers in summer.

Winters are quite cool, but usually sunny; rather, snowfall is an odd occurrence. Springtime is mild, windy and usually warm. Summers are hot (as is common with La Rioja Province), somewhat rainy and, most often, the mercury rises to 38 degrees Celsius (≈100 Fahrenheit) or higher in the shade, which means unpleasant. The rain brings some relief from the stifling Riojan heat. Fall is mild and pleasant, but can go chilly.

Neighboring towns

Landmark snapshots

References

Populated places in La Rioja Province, Argentina